Clark County, Nevada operates several airports:

Harry Reid International Airport, Paradise  - The primary commercial airport for the Las Vegas area
North Las Vegas Airport, North Las Vegas 
Henderson Executive Airport, Henderson 
Perkins Field, Overton	
Jean Sport Aviation Center, Jean 
Ivanpah Valley Airport, Jean - planned future relief airport for McCarran
Mesquite Airport, Mesquite

Other airports 
Boulder City Municipal Airport, 
Echo Bay Airport, Overton 
Kidwell Airport, Cal-Nev-Ari 
Searchlight Airport, Searchlight 	
Sky Ranch Airport, Sandy Valley

Past airports 
Anderson Field - the first airport to serve Las Vegas

Heliports 
Boulder City-Eldorado Substation Heliport - 
Henderson-Car Country Heliport - 
Henderson-Lake Las Vegas Heliport - 
Henderson-St Rose Dominican Hospital Heliport - 
Las Vegas-City Hall Complex Heliport - 
Las Vegas-Claude I Howard Heliport - 
Las Vegas-Circus Circus Heliport - 
Las Vegas-Excalibur Hotel Casino Heliport - 
Las Vegas-Gilbert Development Corp Heliport - 
Las Vegas-Hacienda Hotel Heliport - 
Las Vegas-KLAS Channel 8 Heliport - 
Las Vegas-Las Vegas Helicopters Heliport - 
Las Vegas-Maverick Heliport - 
Las Vegas-Nevada Fish Game Reg III Headquarters Heliport - 
Las Vegas-Summerlin Medical Center Heliport - 
Las Vegas-University Medical Center Southern Nevada Heliport - 
Las Vegas-Valley Hospital Medical Center Heliport - 
Laughlin-Sce Mohave Generating Station Heliport - 
Mesquite-Vista Del Monte Lot 55 Heliport - 
Sandy Valley-Sky Ranch Heliport - 

Airports, Clark County, Nevada